Home garden or homegarden may refer to:
 The yard areas surrounding a house:
 Residential garden
 Back garden
 Front garden
 Forest garden
 Pekarangan, an Indonesian form of forest-gardening in yards

Places 
 Home Garden, California
 Home Gardens, California

See also 
 Home & Garden (disambiguation)